Phoenix Pride (formerly known as Phoenix Pride March & Rally, Desert Pride, Arizona Central Pride, and Phoenix Pride Festival) is a parade and festival held each year in Phoenix, Arizona to celebrate the lesbian, gay, bisexual, and transgender (LGBT) people and their allies.

Unlike other pride parades in major US cities, which is held in June to commemorate the Stonewall riots, Phoenix Pride has been held outside of the summer months in Arizona since at least 2004, due to high summer temperatures.

History

Phoenix has had a history of hosting gay pride-themed events even before the first pride parade was held in 1981. In June 1977, the first gay pride week was organized in Phoenix by the city’s LGBTQ+ community at the time.

The first pride parade in Phoenix took place in 1981, and it was organized by the Lesbian & Gay Pride Planning Committee, which was led by Kirk Baxter and BJ Bud. The first parade was a march from Patriots Square Park (now the site of CityScape) to the Arizona State Capitol. The event was a politically focused march that aimed to bring awareness to LGBT rights issues in the Phoenix area. Newspaper reports at the time estimated 600 to 1,000 people attended the evening march, although later research has put the figure to over 700 people having taken part.

From 1983 to 1985, the march took place on a portion of Phoenix's Central Avenue Corridor, and the event in 1987 became politically focused once again, as it was combined with an event aimed at recalling controversial Governor Evan Mecham.

A non-profit organization was established to coordinate the pride festival in 1991. That same year, after a decade of hosting the event in Phoenix, the pride festival was moved to Tempe Diablo Stadium.

The event was moved to Margaret T. Hance Park in Phoenix in 1998, and moved to Steele Indian School Park in 2003, where it is still being held to this day.

In 2020, the parade and festival was impacted by the coronavirus pandemic, with event organizers saying they will reschedule the event to a time during the fall. Days after the announcement to postpone was made, organizers announced an alternative date of November 7 and 8. 2020's parade was later rescheduled to 2021, in effect cancelling Phoenix Pride for 2020.

Event by year

Criticism
Activists who disrupted 2017's pride parade have criticized Phoenix Pride as being overly commercialized, in its present form, and accused organizers of straying from its original theme of standing up for the rights of people. Similar criticisms have been leveled against other pride parades around the country.

References

External links

 Official Website

1981 establishments in Arizona
Annual events in Arizona
Festivals in Phoenix, Arizona
LGBT in Arizona
Pride parades in the United States
Recurring events established in 1981